Ángel Sandoval Province is one of the fifteen provinces of the Bolivian Santa Cruz Department and is situated in the department's eastern parts.

Location 
Ángel Sandoval Province is located between 16° 16' and 18° 00' South and between 57° 37' and 59° 30' West. It extends over 100–180 km from West to East, and 210 km from North to South.

The province is situated in the Bolivian lowlands and borders Brazil in the East and North, José Miguel de Velasco Province in the Northwest, Chiquitos Province in the Southwest, and Germán Busch Province in the Southeast.

Population 
The population of Ángel Sandoval Province has increased by circa 40% over the recent two decades:
1992: 10,695 inhabitants (census)
2001: 13,073 inhabitants (census)
2005: 14,135 inhabitants (est.)
2010: 14,719 inhabitants (est.)

46.1% of the population are younger than 15 years old. (1992)

The literacy rate of the province increased from 84.4% (1992) to 89.3% (2001).

98.4% of the population speak Spanish, 2.1% speak Quechua, 1.5% Aymara, and 1.2 speak other indigenous languages. (1992)

94.1% of the population are Catholics, 5.3% are Protestants. (1992)

Division 
The province comprises only one municipality, San Matías Municipality. It is identical to Ángel Sandoval Province. The province is further subdivided into four cantons (cantones):
La Gaiba Canton
Las Petas Canton
San Matías Canton
Santo Corazón Canton

Places of interest 
 San Matías Integrated Management Natural Area

References

External links 
General map of province
Detailed map of province towns and rivers
Population data (Spanish)
Social data (Spanish)

Provinces of Santa Cruz Department (Bolivia)